Marija Omaljev (born 5 December 1982) is a Croatian–American film, theatre and television actress.

Biography
Marija Omaljev, also known as Mara Omaljev, was born on 5 December 1982 in Novi Sad, SR Serbia, then part of SFR Yugoslavia. As a pre-teen she moved with her family to Rovinj, Croatia, where she graduated elementary school and high school. In high school, she was a member of Rovinj's theater Gandusio, while she also played in her school's drama assemble.

In 2003, she entered Academy of Performing Arts at the University of Sarajevo, Bosnia, where she earned her M.A. degree in acting. Mara started her professional acting career on the main stage of the Sarajevo National Theatre, where she performed in various classical and contemporary plays. She also starred as a leading actress in more than ten prime time TV series and TV sitcoms such as Zakon ljubavi, Dolina sunca, Lud, zbunjen, normalan, Ruža vjetrova, The Real O'Neals as well as in Croatian, Bosnian, German, Austrian, Turkish and American feature Films.

She  married a Bosnian-American actor Miraj Grbić in 2008. Since 2013, they are living in Los Angeles, California, United States. They had a daughter Billie on October 15, 2021

Filmography

Film

Television

References

External links
  
 
 
 http://www.glasistre.hr/vijesti/mozaik/marija-omaljev-za-10-godina-vidim-se-u-los-angelesu-399699
 http://www.gloria.hr/marija-omaljev-i-miraj-grbic-zudnja-za-prvim-tv-poljupcem/
 http://www.24sata.hr/domace-zvijezde/zvijezde-ruze-vjetrova-nosile-su-humanitarnu-modnu-reviju-303463
 https://web.archive.org/web/20131002191253/http://www.avaz.ba/showbiz/film-i-tv/marija-omaljev-i-miraj-grbic-snimaju-ruzu-vjetrova
 http://www.story.hr/marija-omaljev-suprug-i-ja-prihvacamo-projekte-u-istim-gradovima-108367

1982 births
Living people
Actors from Novi Sad
Croatian actresses
Croatian emigrants to the United States
Croats of Vojvodina